Teucrium vincentinum (syn. Teucrium vicentinum) is a species of germander in the family Lamiaceae, endemic to southwestern Portugal and restricted to the Southwest Alentejo and Vicentine Coast Natural Park. It inhabits low scrubland in fixed dunes, cliffs and coastal rocks, on sandy or limestone substrates.

References

vincentinum
Endemic flora of Portugal
Endemic flora of the Iberian Peninsula